Responsive Education Solutions, Inc. (Responsive Ed) is a non-profit charter management organization headquartered in Lewisville, Texas, in the Dallas-Fort Worth area.

Responsive Ed was established in 1998.  In 2015, Responsive Ed schools had enrolled 9,208 students.

Operations
As of January 2016 Responsive Ed operates seventy campuses in the states of Texas and Arkansas and serves over 17,000 students.  Responsive Ed previously operated campuses in Indiana but as of January 2016 no longer does so.

Responsive Ed operates schools under the following names:
Premier High School—operating individualized self-paced curricula for high school students
Classical Academies—operating full-grade schools using classical education (including teaching of Latin) (as of 2018 ResponsiveEd is converting these schools to Founders Classical Academies)
Founders Classical Academies—similar to Classical Academies; curriculum is designed in coordination with Hillsdale College

Controversy
Max Brantley of the Arkansas Times wrote that the Walton Foundation had given "significant support" to Responsive Ed.

In 2014 Zack Kopplin of Slate used an Open Records Request to obtain Responsive Ed's biology workbooks. According to Kopplin, the books "overtly and underhandedly discredit evidence-based science and allow creationism into public-school classrooms."

References

Schools in Texas
1998 establishments in Texas
Educational institutions established in 1998
Charter management organizations